Julie Allemand (born 7 July 1996) is a Belgian basketball player for the Chicago Sky of the Women's National Basketball Association (WNBA). She was formerly with Lyon ASVEL Féminin and is a member of the Belgian national team. In the 2016 WNBA draft, she was selected by the Indiana Fever in the third round.

Career

WNBA career

Indiana Fever (2020) 
Allemand was drafted by the Indiana Fever in the third round of the 2016 WNBA draft. She spent 2016–19 with her Belgian professional team, BC Castors Braine, before joining the Fever for the 2020 season.

She had a successful rookie season, recording the second-most assists per game in the league (5.8). She was named to the 2020 AP All-Rookie team. 

She sat out of the 2021 season, citing mental health struggles and burnout after the Olympics.

Chicago Sky (2022–present) 
Ahead of the 2022 season, Allemand was traded to the Chicago Sky as part of a three-team deal.

International career 
She participated at the 2018 FIBA Women's Basketball World Cup.

WNBA career statistics

Regular season 

|-
| align="left" | 2020
| align="left" | Indiana
| style="background:#D3D3D3"| 22° || style="background:#D3D3D3"| 22° || 32.5 || .455 || .478 || .733 || 4.5 || 5.8 || 1.1 || 0.4 || 2.6 || 8.5
|-
| align="left" | 2022
| align="left" | Chicago
| 25 || 4 || 16.1 || .417 || .290 || .833 || 1.6 || 3.4 || 0.6 || 0.1 || 1.3 || 3.0
|-
| align="left" | Career
| align="left" | 2 years, 2 teams
| 47 || 26 || 23.8 || .443 || .431 || .771 || 3.0 || 4.5 || 0.8 || 0.3 || 1.9 || 5.6

Playoffs 

|-
| align="left" | 2022
| align="left" | Chicago
| 8 || 0 || 11.5 || .500 || .300 || .500 || 0.5 || 2.0 || 0.3 || 0.1 || 0.5 || 2.5
|-
| align="left" | Career
| align="left" | 1 year, 1 team
| 8 || 0 || 11.5 || .500 || .300 || .500 || 0.5 || 2.0 || 0.3 || 0.1 || 0.5 || 2.5

Personal life
Allemand is openly lesbian.

References

External links
 
 
 
 

1996 births
Living people
Basketball players at the 2020 Summer Olympics
Belgian expatriate basketball people in France
Belgian expatriate basketball people in the United States
Belgian women's basketball players
Olympic basketball players of Belgium
Indiana Fever draft picks
Indiana Fever players
Chicago Sky players
Lesbian sportswomen
LGBT basketball players
Belgium LGBT sportspeople
Belgian lesbians
Point guards
Sportspeople from Liège